Beverley is a western suburb of Adelaide, South Australia. It is located in the City of Charles Sturt.

Geography
The suburb is mainly bounded by Port Road, East Avenue, Ledger Road and Grange Road.

History
Beverley incorporates the formerly separate suburb of York, site of the skin and fertiliser works of Crompton and Sons. Other once important manufacturing businesses of the area were Pope Products Ltd. on Princess Street, Adelaide Potteries Ltd. on Toogood Avenue and a number of independent brickworks.

Beverley Post Office was open from 1 January 1881 until 1901.

Demographics

The 2016 Census by the Australian Bureau of Statistics counted 1,498 persons in Allenby Gardens on census night. Of these, 52.7% were male and 47.3% were female.

The majority of residents (68.0%) are of Australian birth, with other common census responses being India (5.3%), England (1.9%), Italy (1.6%), China (1.4%), and Greece (1.3%). Additionally, people of Aboriginal and/or Torres Strait Islander descent made up 1.2% of the suburb.

In terms of religious affiliation, 33.2% of residents attributed themselves to being irreligious, 19.3% attributed themselves to being Catholic, 7.7% attributed themselves to be Eastern Orthodox, and 5.0 attributed themselves to being Anglican. Within Allenby Gardens, 93.1% of the residents were employed, with the remaining 6.9% being unemployed.

Politics

Local government
Beverley is part of Beverley Ward in the City of Charles Sturt local government area, being represented in that council by Independent Edgar Agius and Labor member Mick Harley.

State and federal
Beverley lies in the state electoral district of Cheltenham, but prior to the 2016 redistribution was in the Croydon district. Beverley is in the federal electoral division of Hindmarsh. The suburb is represented in the South Australian House of Assembly by Joe Szakacs and federally by Mark Butler.

Community

Schools
St Michael's College is a local independent Catholic high school, which services students in years 6–12. It is located on East Avenue.

Facilities and attractions

Adelaide Arena
Adelaide Arena, located between William Street and Toogood Avenue, is an indoor basketball stadium and function centre with a sitting capacity of 8000. Also known as Distinctive Homes Dome and, formerly, Clipsal Powerhouse, the facility was constructed in 1991, replacing the former Apollo Stadium. It is the home of the Adelaide 36ers and the Adelaide Lightning.

Parks

The only park within Beverley is the Toogood Reserve.

Transportation

Roads
Beverley is serviced by Port Road, connecting the suburb to Port Adelaide and Adelaide city centre, and Grange Road, which forms part of its southern boundary. East Avenue, on Beverley's eastern boundary, links Port and Grange roads.

Public transport
Beverley is serviced by public transport run by the Adelaide Metro.

See also

 List of Adelaide suburbs

References

External links

Suburbs of Adelaide
Populated places established in 1849
1849 establishments in Australia